Ring der Delphine is an album by the German new age band Cusco. It was released originally in 1989.

Three of the tracks were later edited for the 1990 release Water Stories on Higher Octave Music.  In 1996, the entire album was re-recorded with some changes and released with English titles as Ring of the Dolphin, also on Higher Octave Music.

Track listing
Ring der Delphine
 "Ring der Delphine"
 "Methos"
 "Der Zauber"
 "Die Wasser von Cesme"
 "Jebel At Tarik"
 "Bur Said"
 "Kinderkreuzzug"
 "Ring der Delphine (Reprise)"

Ring of the Dolphin
 "Ring of the Dolphin"
 "Methos"
 "The Spell"
 "Waters of Cesme"
 "Djebel at Tarik"
 "Bur Said"
 "Children's Crusade"
 "Ring of the Dolphin (Reprise)"

1989 albums
Cusco (band) albums